Scolopendra (through Latin from  Greek , skolopendra) is a species-rich genus of large tropical centipedes of the family Scolopendridae.

Description
The species vary considerably in coloration and size. Scolopendra are mostly very large centipedes. The largest species found in tropical climates can exceed  and are the largest living centipedes in the world.
All Scolopendra species can deliver a painful bite, injecting venom through their forcipules, which are not fangs or other mouthparts; rather, these are modified legs on the first body segment.

Ecology
Scolopendra are active predators, feeding primarily on insects and other invertebrates. Larger specimens have been observed preying on frogs, tarantulas, lizards, birds, snakes, rodents, and even bats. Two southeast Asian species, S. cataracta and S. paradoxa, as well as S. alcyona from the Ryukyu Islands, are amphibious, as these species can travel underwater by swimming or walking.

Venom
The venom is not medically significant for most species; however, bites from several species can cause intense and long-lasting pain and swelling. Large Scolopendra species from Asian/Pacific regions, such as Scolopendra subspinipes and Scolopendra dehaani, are particularly potent, and have caused one reported fatality. In 2014, a fatality was reported for a bite from a Scolopendra gigantea. The venom of certain Scolopendra species were found to contain compounds such as serotonin, haemolytic phospholipase, a cardiotoxic protein, and a cytolysin.

Taxonomic history
Scolopendra was one of the genera created by Carl Linnaeus in his 1758 10th edition of Systema Naturae, the starting point for zoological nomenclature. Only two of the species originally assigned to the genus remain so: Scolopendra gigantea and S. morsitans; the latter was chosen to be the type species by Opinion 454 of the International Commission on Zoological Nomenclature, overruling a previous designation by Pierre André Latreille, in which he chose Linnaeus' Scolopendra forficata (now Lithobius forficatus) as the type species.

Species
The genus Scolopendra contains these species:

Scolopendra abnormis Lewis & Daszak, 1996
Scolopendra afer (Meinert, 1886)
Scolopendra alcyona Tsukamoto & Shimano, 2021
Scolopendra algerina Newport, 1845
Scolopendra alternans Leach, 1813
Scolopendra andhrensis Jangi & Dass, 1984
Scolopendra angulata Newport, 1844
Scolopendra angusticollis Murray, 1887
Scolopendra anomia Newport, 1844
Scolopendra appendiculata Daday, 1891
Scolopendra arborea Lewis, 1982
Scolopendra arenicola (Lawrence, 1975)
Scolopendra arthrorhabdoides Ribaut, 1912
Scolopendra attemsi Lewis, Minelli & Shelley, 2006
Scolopendra aztecorum Verhoeff, 1934
Scolopendra calcarata Porat, 1876
Scolopendra canidens Newport, 1844
 Scolopendra cataracta Siriwut, Edgecombe & Panha, 2016
Scolopendra childreni Newport, 1844
Scolopendra chlora Chamberlin, 1942
Scolopendra chlorotes C. L. Koch, 1856
Scolopendra cingulata Latreille, 1829
Scolopendra clavipes C. L. Koch, 1847
Scolopendra concolor Newport, 1845
Scolopendra crassa Templeton, 1846
Scolopendra cretica Attems, 1902
Scolopendra cribrifera Gervais, 1847
Scolopendra crudelis C. L. Koch, 1847
Scolopendra dalmatica C. L. Koch, 1847
Scolopendra dawydoffi Kronmüller, 2012
Scolopendra dehaani Brandt, 1840
Scolopendra ellorensis Jangi & Dass, 1984
Scolopendra fissispina L. Koch, 1865
Scolopendra foveolata Verhoeff, 1937
Scolopendra galapagoensis Bollman, 1889
Scolopendra gigantea Linnaeus, 1758
Scolopendra gracillima Attems, 1898
Scolopendra hainanum Kronmüller, 2012
Scolopendra hardwickei Newport, 1844
Scolopendra hermosa Chamberlin, 1941
Scolopendra heros Girard, 1853
Scolopendra horrida C. L. Koch, 1847
Scolopendra inaequidens Gervais, 1847
Scolopendra indiae (Chamberlin, 1914)
Scolopendra indica Meinert, 1886
Scolopendra inermipes C. L. Koch, 1847
Scolopendra inermis Newport, 1845
Scolopendra jangii Khanna & Yadav, 1997
Scolopendra japonica Koch, 1878
Scolopendra koreana (Verhoeff, 1934)
Scolopendra labiata C. L. Koch, 1863
Scolopendra laeta Haase, 1887
Scolopendra langi (Chamberlin, 1927)
Scolopendra latro Meinert, 1886
Scolopendra leki (Waldock & Edgecombe 2012)
Scolopendra limicolor Wood, 1861
Scolopendra lucasii Gervais, 1847
Scolopendra lufengia S. Kang et al., 2017
Scolopendra lutea (Attems, 1928)
Scolopendra madagascariensis Attems, 1910
Scolopendra malkini Chamberlin, 1955
Scolopendra mazbii Gravely, 1912
Scolopendra media (Muralewicz, 1926)
Scolopendra melionii Lucas, 1853
Scolopendra metuenda Pocock, 1895
Scolopendra michoacana Chamberlin, 1941
Scolopendra mima Chamberlin, 1942
Scolopendra mirabilis (Porat, 1876)
Scolopendra monticola (Lawrence, 1975)
Scolopendra morsitans Linnaeus, 1758
Scolopendra multidens Newport, 1844
Scolopendra negrocapitis Zhang & Wang, 1999
Scolopendra nuda (Jangi & Dass, 1980)
Scolopendra occidentalis F. Meinert, 1886
Scolopendra octodentata Verhoeff, 1934
Scolopendra oraniensis Lucas, 1846
Scolopendra paradoxa Doménech, 2018
Scolopendra pachygnatha Pocock, 1895
Scolopendra paranuda (Khanna & Tripathi, 1987)
Scolopendra pentagramma Motschoulsky, 1886
Scolopendra pinguis Pocock, 1891
Scolopendra polymorpha Wood, 1861
Scolopendra pomacea C. L. Koch, 1847
Scolopendra puncticeps Wood, 1861
Scolopendra punensis Jangi & Dass, 1984
Scolopendra robusta Kraepelin, 1903
Scolopendra sanatillae Bollman, 1893
Scolopendra silhetensis Newport, 1845
Scolopendra spinipriva Bücherl, 1946
Scolopendra spinosissima Kraepelin, 1903
Scolopendra subspinipes Leach, 1816
Scolopendra sumichrasti Saussure, 1860
Scolopendra tenuitarsis Pocock, 1895
Scolopendra valida Lucas, 1840
Scolopendra violacea Fabricius, 1798
Scolopendra viridicornis Newport, 1844
Scolopendra viridipes Dufour, 1820
Scolopendra viridis Say, 1821
Scolopendra zuluana (Lawrence, 1958)
One fossil species, †Scolopendra proavita, is known from Baltic amber deposits from the Eocene of Poland. Fossil remains of a species tentatively assigned to S. morsitans (as S. (cf) morsitans) are also known from Pliocene-aged rocks in the Makapansgat of South Africa.

See also
Gu (poison)

References

Centipede genera